Rashid Magomedgadzhievich Magomedov (born May 14, 1984 in Dagestan) is a Russian mixed martial artist.  He is a former amateur Light heavyweight and Middleweight boxer, and competed at the lightweight mixed martial artist in the Ultimate Fighting Championship. Magomedov is also a former M-1 Global welterweight champion.

Early life
Magomedov was born in Makhachkala, Dagestan. During his childhood Magomedov engaged in various types of martial arts including karate, boxing, and kickboxing winning national competitions in each discipline. Magomedov entered military service and competed in martial arts competitions and in 2004 won the title of Master of Sports in the hand-to-hand fighting category. After Magomedov's period of army service he trained in Combat Sambo.

Mixed martial arts career

M-1 Global
Magomedov was scheduled to challenge Shamil Zavurov for the M-1 Welterweight championship at M-1 Challenge XXX: Shamil Zavurov vs. Yasubey Enomoto II on December 9, 2011.  The fight, however, was postponed.

Magomedov faced Yasubey Enomoto on March 16, 2012 at M-1 Challenge 31. He won the fight via unanimous decision (50–45, 49–47, 50–45) and became the new M-1 Global Welterweight Champion.

Magomedov faced Alexander Yakovlev on November 15, 2012 at M-1 Challenge 35. He won the fight via unanimous decision.

Ultimate Fighting Championship
Magomedov made his UFC debut against fellow promotional newcomer Anthony Rocco Martin in a lightweight bout on February 1, 2014 at UFC 169. After surviving a tight arm bar submission attempt by Martin in the first round, he rallied to win the fight via unanimous decision (29–28, 29–28, 29–28).

In his second fight, Magomedov faced Rodrigo Damm on May 31, 2014 at The Ultimate Fighter Brazil 3 Finale. He won the fight via unanimous decision.

Magomedov faced Elias Silvério on December 20, 2014 at UFC Fight Night 58. After winning the first two rounds, he won the fight via TKO in the third round after dropping Silvério with a stiff left hook and following up with punches, becoming the first man to beat Silvério.

Magomedov faced Gilbert Burns at UFC Fight Night 77 on November 7, 2015. He dominated the three rounds and won via unanimous decision.

Magomedov was expected to face Chris Wade on May 8, 2016 at UFC Fight Night 87. However, Magomedov pulled out of the bout on March 7 due to a knee injury. He was replaced by Rustam Khabilov.

Magomedov faced Beneil Dariush on November 5, 2016 at The Ultimate Fighter Latin America 3 Finale. He lost the fight via unanimous decision.

Magomedov faced Bobby Green on April 15, 2017 at UFC on Fox 24. He won the fight via split decision.

Professional Fighters League

PFL Season 2018
On August 20, 2017 it was reported Magomedov had parted ways with the UFC as the two sides had failed to renegotiate a contract. He signed with the Professional Fighters League (PFL) and took part in the promotion's Lightweight Grand Prix.

In his first fight in the tournament, Magomedov faced Luiz Firmino on August 2, 2018. He won the fight by unanimous decision. Magomedov then fought twice at PFL 9 on October 13, 2018. In the quarterfinals, he fought Will Brooks to a draw but advanced via first round tiebreaker. He then faced Thiago Tavares in the semifinals and won via TKO in the second round. Magomedov then faced Natan Schulte in the finals at PFL 11 on December 31, 2018. He lost the back-and-forth bout by unanimous decision.

PFL Sesason 2019
Magomedov started the regular season against Loik Radzhabov at PFL 2 on May 23, 2019. He won the fight via unanimous decision.

In the second regular season bout he faced Nate Andrews at PFL 5 on July 25, 2019. He lost the fight via unanimous decision but advanced to playoffs.

In the first playoff fight, Magomedov faced Akhmed Aliev at PFL 8 on October 17, 2019. He lost the fight via unanimous decision and was eliminated from the season.

Absolute Championship Akhmat
After two seasons in the PFL, Magomedov signed a contract with the Absolute Championship Akhmat. He was initially expected to make his debut against Eduard Vartanyan at ACA 108 on August 8, 2020, but was forced to withdraw from the bout due to an injury.

He made his promotional debut against Artiom Damkovsky at ACA 113 on November 6, 2020. He won the fight via unanimous decision.

Rashid faced Mukhamed Kokov on March 26, 2021 at ACA 120: Oliveira vs. Bibulatov. He won a close bout via split decision.

Rashid faced Alexander Sarnavskiy on September 24, 2021 at ACA 129: Sarnavskiy vs. Magomedov. He lost the close bout via split decision.

Rashid faced Ali Bagov in the semi-finals of the Lightweight Grand Prix on July 22, 2022 at ACA 141. The bout ended in a no contest after the president of ACA, Mairbek Khasiev, stopped the bout after the fourth round due to inactivity from both fighters.

Championships and accomplishments

Mixed martial arts
M-1 Global
M-1 Global Welterweight Championship (One time)
Two successful title defenses

Sambo
Russian Combat Sambo Federation
Dagestan Combat Sambo Championships Runner-up.

Hand-to-hand combat
Russian Union of Martial Arts
Russian National Champion of Army Hand-to-hand Combat.
Russian Union of Martial Arts
Russian National Hand-to-hand Champion.

Kickboxing
Russian Kickboxing Federation (RKF)
Russian Nationals 2006 - bronze medalist - 70 kg.

Mixed martial arts record 

|-
| NC
|align=center|25–6–1 (1)
|Ali Bagov
| NC (lack of activity)
|ACA 141: Froes vs. Suleymanov
|
|align=center|4
|align=center| 5:00
|Sochi, Russia
|
|-
|Loss
|align=center|25–6–1
| Alexander Sarnavskiy
| Decision (split)
| ACA 129: Sarnavskiy vs. Magomedov 
| 
|align=center|5
|align=center|5:00
| Moscow, Russia
| 
|-
|Win
|align=center|25–5–1
|Mukhamed Kokov
|Decision (split)
|ACA 120: Oliveira vs. Bibulatov
|
|align=center|3
|align=center|5:00
|Saint Petersburg, Russia
|
|-
|Win
|align=center|24–5–1
|Artiom Damkovsky
|Decision (unanimous)
|ACA 113: Kerefov vs. Gadzhiev
|
|align=center|3
|align=center|5:00
|Moscow, Russia
|
|-
|Loss
|align=center|23–5–1
|Akhmet Aliev	
|Decision (unanimous)
|PFL 8
|
|align=center| 2
|align=center| 5:00
|Las Vegas, Nevada, United States
|
|-
|Loss
|align=center|23–4–1
|Nate Andrews
|Decision (unanimous)
|PFL 5
|
|align=center|3
|align=center|5:00
|Atlantic City, New Jersey, United States 
|
|-
|Win
|align=center|23–3–1
|Loik Radzhabov
|Decision (unanimous)
|PFL 2
|
|align=center|3
|align=center|5:00
|Uniondale, New York, United States 
|
|-
|Loss
|align=center|22–3–1
|Natan Schulte
|Decision (unanimous)
|PFL 11
|
|align=center|5
|align=center|5:00
|New York City, New York, United States 
|
|-
|Win
|align=center|22–2–1
|Thiago Tavares
|TKO (punches)
| rowspan=2| PFL 9
| rowspan=2| 
| align=center| 2
| align=center| 3:36
| rowspan=2| Long Beach, California, United States
|
|-
|Draw
|align=center|
|Will Brooks	
|Decision (unanimous)
| align=center| 2
| align=center| 5:00
|
|-
|Win
|align=center|21–2
|Luiz Firmino
| Decision (unanimous)
|PFL 5
|
|align=center|3
|align=center|5:00
|Uniondale, New York, United States
|
|-
|Win
|align=center|20–2
|Bobby Green
|Decision (split)
|UFC on Fox: Johnson vs. Reis
|
|align=center|3
|align=center|5:00
|Kansas City, Missouri, United States
|
|-
|Loss
|align=center|19–2
|Beneil Dariush
|Decision (unanimous)
|The Ultimate Fighter Latin America 3 Finale: dos Anjos vs. Ferguson
|
|align=center|3
|align=center|5:00
|Mexico City, Mexico
|
|-
| Win
| align=center| 19–1
| Gilbert Burns
| Decision (unanimous)
| UFC Fight Night: Belfort vs. Henderson 3
| 
| align=center| 3
| align=center| 5:00
| São Paulo, Brazil
|
|-
| Win
| align=center| 18–1
| Elias Silvério
| TKO (punches)
| UFC Fight Night: Machida vs. Dollaway
| 
| align=center| 3
| align=center| 4:57
| Barueri, Brazil
| 
|-
| Win
| align=center| 17–1
| Rodrigo Damm
| Decision (unanimous)
| The Ultimate Fighter Brazil 3 Finale: Miocic vs. Maldonado
| 
| align=center| 3
| align=center| 5:00
| São Paulo, Brazil
| 
|-
| Win
| align=center| 16–1
| Anthony Rocco Martin
| Decision (unanimous)
| UFC 169
| 
| align=center| 3
| align=center| 5:00
| Newark, New Jersey, United States
| 
|-
| Win
| align=center| 15–1
| Alexander Yakovlev
| Decision (unanimous)
| M-1 Challenge 35
| 
| align=center| 5
| align=center| 5:00
| St. Petersburg, Russia
| 
|-
| Win
| align=center| 14–1
| Yasubey Enomoto
| Decision (unanimous)
| M-1 Challenge 31
| 
| align=center| 5
| align=center| 5:00
| St. Petersburg, Russia
| |
|-
| Win
| align=center| 13–1
| Aurel Pirtea
| Decision (unanimous)
| WMAC - Finals
| 
| align=center| 2
| align=center| 5:00
| Yalta, Russia
| 
|-
| Win
| align=center| 12–1
| Mikel Cortes
| TKO (doctor stoppage)
| WMAC - Semifinals
| 
| align=center| 2
| align=center| 5:00
| Yalta, Russia
| 
|-
| Win
| align=center| 11–1
| Uriy Nazarec
| Submission (rear-naked choke)
| WMAC - Quarterfinals
| 
| align=center| 1
| align=center| N/A
| Yalta, Russia
| 
|-
| Win
| align=center| 10–1
| Rafal Moks
| TKO (punches)
| M-1 Challenge 23: Guram vs. Grishin
| 
| align=center| 1
| align=center| 2:05
| St. Petersburg, Russia
| 
|-
| Win
| align=center| 9–1
| Igor Araújo
| Decision (unanimous)
| M-1 Challenge 21: Guram vs. Garner  
| 
| align=center| 3
| align=center| 5:00
| St. Petersburg, Russia
| 
|-
| Win
| align=center| 8–1
| Dan Hope
| KO (punch)
| Sambo-70 / M-1 Global - Sochi Open European Championships  
| 
| align=center| 1
| align=center| 0:57
| Sochi, Russia
| 
|-
| Loss
| align=center| 7–1
| Magomedrasul Khasbulaev
| Decision (split)
| M-1 Selection 2010: Eastern Europe Round 2
| 
| align=center| 3
| align=center| 5:00
| Kyiv, Ukraine
| 
|-
| Win
| align=center| 7–0
| Alexei Nazarov
| TKO (punches)
| M-1 Challenge 20: 2009 Finals
| 
| align=center| 3
| align=center| 4:33
| St. Petersburg, Russia
| 
|-
| Win
| align=center| 6–0
| Shamil Zavurov
| Decision (split)
| M-1 Challenge: 2009 Selections 9
| 
| align=center| 3
| align=center| 5:00
| St. Petersburg, Russia
| 
|-
| Win
| align=center| 5–0
| Magomedrasul Khasbulaev
| Decision (unanimous)
| M-1 Challenge: 2009 Selections 5
| 
| align=center| 3
| align=center| 5:00
| St. Petersburg, Russia
| 
|-
| Win
| align=center| 4–0
| Yusup Islamov
| TKO (punches)
| MFT - Battle on the Volga 2
| 
| align=center| 1
| align=center| 1:22
| Volgograd, Russia
| 
|-
| Win
| align=center| 3–0
| Bagavdin Gadzhimuradov
| TKO (punches)
| M-1 Challenge: 2009 Selections 1
| 
| align=center| 2
| align=center| 1:37
| St. Petersburg, Russia
| 
|-
| Win
| align=center| 2–0
| Valeriv Chernousov
| KO (punch)
| Gladiators 2 
| 
| align=center| 2
| align=center| 1:58
| Ufa, Russia
| 
|-
| Win
| align=center| 1–0
| Vladimir Vladimirov
| TKO (punches)
| MFU - Mix Fight Ufa
| 
| align=center| 1
| align=center| 3:40
| Ufa, Russia
|

See also
 List of current mixed martial arts champions
 List of male mixed martial artists

References

External links
 
 

Living people
Dagestani mixed martial artists
Dargwa people
Welterweight mixed martial artists
Russian male mixed martial artists
Mixed martial artists utilizing sambo
Mixed martial artists utilizing boxing
Mixed martial artists utilizing karate
Mixed martial artists utilizing ARB
1984 births
Sportspeople from Makhachkala
Russian male boxers
Russian male karateka
People from Coconut Creek, Florida
Ultimate Fighting Championship male fighters